Afshar is a hillside settlement situated in western Kabul city, the capital of Afghanistan. Most of its population are of the Hazara ethnic group.

See also
Afshar operation

References 

Neighborhoods of Kabul